Montgomery Cricket Club Ground, formerly known as the Biscuit Factory Ground,
was a cricket ground in Sahiwal, Punjab, Pakistan. It staged 50 first-class and 29 List A matches from 1982 to 1998.

The ground was at the Montgomery Biscuit Factory, which was the largest employer in Sahiwal. The factory's owner, Basharat Shafi (1944–2011), who had played a first-class match for Multan in 1972 and was president of the Multan Cricket Association, developed the ground to a high standard. Apart from domestic matches, the ground also staged the only warm-up match of the Zimbabwean tour of 1996-97.

While playing a first-class match at Zafar Ali Stadium in Sahiwal on their 1987-88 tour of Pakistan the England players were accommodated in the dormitories at the Montgomery Biscuit Factory, much to their displeasure.

References

External links
 Montgomery Cricket Club Ground, Sahiwal at CricketArchive

Sahiwal District
Cricket grounds in Pakistan